Brett Grimley (born 3 March 1960) is a former Australian rules footballer who played for Fitzroy in the Victorian Football League (VFL) during the 1980s.

Grimley started out in the Queensland Australian Football League where he played with Wilston Grange. He made his Fitzroy debut in the opening round of the 1983 season but was unable to establish himself in the side. After returning to Queensland, Grimley had success as Wilston Grange's full-forward and kicked 107 goals in 1987 to top the QAFL goal-kicking. He represented Queensland at the 1988 Adelaide Bicentennial Carnival.

His father, Ken, is a member of the Queensland 'Team of the Century' and also spent some time at Fitzroy. They are the only father and son combination from the state to have competed in the VFL.

References

Holmesby, Russell and Main, Jim (2007). The Encyclopedia of AFL Footballers. 7th ed. Melbourne: Bas Publishing.

1960 births
Living people
Fitzroy Football Club players
Wilston Grange Football Club players
Australian rules footballers from Queensland